Nóra Simóka (born 10 December 1980) is a Hungarian modern pentathlete. She represented Hungary at the 2000 Summer Olympics held in Sydney, Australia in the women's modern pentathlon and she finished in 23rd place.

References

External links 
 

1980 births
Living people
Hungarian female modern pentathletes
Olympic modern pentathletes of Hungary
Modern pentathletes at the 2000 Summer Olympics